Santo Stefano di Cadore is a town in the province of Belluno, in the northern Italian region of Veneto.

Twin towns
Santo Stefano di Cadore is twinned with:

  Montespertoli, Italy

References 

Cities and towns in Veneto